Ras-I Alujah Bramble (born Livingstone Bramble on September 3, 1960) is the former WBA Lightweight boxing Champion of the World. Bramble was raised on Saint Croix, U.S. Virgin Islands. He became the first world champion from Saint Kitts and Nevis. Although his last recorded fight occurred on June 26, 2003, he has never officially announced his retirement, and constantly hints that he wishes to fight on. His current record stands at 40–26–3 (25 KOs).

Boxing career
Bramble began boxing professionally on October 16, 1980, knocking out Jesus Serrano in round one. He would outpoint Serrano in a rematch. In his fourth fight, Bramble faced the more experienced, fringe contender Jorge Nina, winning by a disqualification in the second round.

On June 4, 1981, Bramble beat Ken Bogner by a knockout in seven rounds.  But later that year, on August 31, he lost for the first time, in an eight-round decision to Anthony Fletcher. After that loss, he built a streak of thirteen wins in a row, including wins over former world title challengers James Busceme and Gaetan Hart, as well as top ten ranked fighters like Jerome Artis and Rafael Williams.

Bramble was given a shot at a world title when the WBA pitted him and Ray "Boom Boom" Mancini for the Lightweight title on June 1, 1984. Bramble entered the ring sporting a record of 20 wins and only one loss, with thirteen knockouts, but was a heavy underdog to Mancini, who had recently gone fourteen rounds with the legendary Alexis Argüello, and he was also coming off a successful title defense on January 14, a third-round knockout of two time world champion Bobby Chacon. Furthermore, talks about a super-fight between Mancini and IBF world Jr. Welterweight champion Aaron Pryor were already under way. Nevertheless, Bramble cut Mancini in round one and went on to become the WBA world Lightweight champion by a fourteenth-round knockout in Buffalo, New York. After this, The Ring published a cover of Bramble, WBA Jr. Lightweight world champion Rocky Lockridge, and their trainer Lou Duva. The cover read: The championship season.

After defeating Edwin Curet by a ten-round decision in a non-title bout, Bramble met Mancini in a rematch on February 16, 1985. In what marked the debut of the Compubox scoring system, Bramble defeated Mancini by an extremely close but unanimous fifteen-round decision to retain his world title at Reno, Nevada, in front of an HBO Boxing audience.

After Héctor Camacho defeated José Luis Ramírez to claim the WBC title on August 10 of that year, there was widespread talk about a series of fights between Bramble, Camacho and IBF world Lightweight champion Jimmy Paul, to see who would become the unified world champion.

Exactly one year after defeating Mancini for the second time, Bramble defeated the WBA's number one challenger, Tyrone Crawley, by a knockout in round thirteen.

Bramble's next defense was supposed to be a preparation fight for him to meet Camacho. He and Camacho each defended their crowns on September 26, in what was nicknamed The Preamble to Bramble. However, in what many saw as a surprise, Bramble suffered a defeat to Edwin Rosario, who knocked him out in two rounds at Miami.

After this loss, Bramble never regained his status as a top lightweight. He fought on, and met some future or former world champions such as Freddie Pendleton, Charles Murray, James "Buddy" McGirt, Roger Mayweather, Rafael Ruelas and Kostya Tszyu, as well as world title challengers like Wilfredo Rivera, Oba Carr and Darryl Tyson. However, he was on the losing end of most of these fights.

During the 1990s Bramble went through several name changes, often fighting under the names of Ras-I-Bramble or Abuja Bramble.

Personal life

When Bramble became a world champion, rumors of him practicing witchcraft became widespread. He did not deny these rumours. Bramble did enjoy walking around with his pet snake. He used to walk into the boxing ring with one on his neck, and he was pictured, again on the cover of Ring Magazine, with his snake. In 1985, Bramble stated that he hates chickens and he strangles them. It was also reported that Bramble had skinned a dead cat and put it on his living room wall. During this time he had a boa constrictor and a ferret named spider. He also had a dog named snake. He described himself as "the only Rasta prizefighter there is".

Bramble is often reported to being a long-term vegetarian who has not eaten meat since the early 1970s, however he does eat fish and his diet has been described as consisting "primarily of fish, spaghetti, fungi, pumpkin and coconuts".

An avid marathon runner, Bramble competes each year at the International Boxing Hall of Fame's celebrity marathon. He is one of the most sought after autograph signers there every year. Bramble currently lives in Las Vegas. Bramble is the subject of a full biography by boxing journalist Brian D'Ambrosio. The book is titled Rasta in the Ring: The Life of Rastafarian Boxer Livingstone Bramble and was published in 2016. The book dissects and explains the life and beliefs of the Rastafarian boxer.

References

External links
 

!colspan="3" style="background:#C1D8FF;"| Regional titles
|-

1960 births
Living people
People from Saint Croix, U.S. Virgin Islands
Saint Kitts and Nevis emigrants to the United States Virgin Islands
Saint Kitts and Nevis male boxers
Bramble, Livingstone
World boxing champions